Google Docs Editors is a web-based productivity office suite offered by Google within its Google Drive service. The suite includes Google Docs, Google Sheets, Google Slides, Google Drawings, Google Forms, Google Sites, and Google Keep. It used to also include Google Fusion Tables until it was discontinued in 2019.

The Google Docs Editors suite is available freely for users with personal Google accounts: through a web application, a set of mobile apps for Android and iOS, and a desktop application for Google's ChromeOS.

Availability
The Google Docs Editors suite is available free of charge for users with personal Google accounts. It is also offered as part of Google's business-centered service, Google Workspace.

Competition
The suite mainly competes with Microsoft Office and iWork software suites. It pioneered real-time collaborative editing since its inception in 2006, while Microsoft Office only introduced it in 2013. The suite can open and write Microsoft Office file formats.

See also 
 List of collaborative software
 Comparison of office suites
 Microsoft Office
 Microsoft 365
 iWork

References

Docs Editors
Docs Editors
Office suites